The 2020 cycling season for Israel Start-Up Nation began in January at the Tour Down Under in Australia.

The 2020 season is the team's first as a UCI WorldTeam. After the 2019 season, the team merged with the former  team and took over the latter's WorldTeam license, stepping up from the UCI Professional Continental level. To coincide with this promotion, the team changed their name from Israel Cycling Academy to Israel Start-Up Nation, while the former name became the name of the team's Continental level development squad.

Roster

Riders who joined the team for the 2020 season

Riders who left the team during or after the 2019 season

Season victories

National, Continental and World Champions

Footnotes

References

External links

 
 

Israel–Premier Tech
Israel Start-Up Nation
Israel Start-Up Nation